= QALO =

American jewelry company headquartered

- Company type: Private
- Industry: Retail
- Founded: 2013
- Founders: Ted Baker (CEO); KC Holiday
- Headquarters: Santa Ana, California, U.S.
- Area served: Global
- Products: Silicone jewelry
- Website: Official website

QALO is an American jewelry company headquartered in Santa Ana, California. It primarily produces wedding and commitment rings made from silicone rather than traditional metal. QALO is an acronym for "Quality Athletics Love Outdoors."

== History and products ==
QALO was founded by Ted Baker and KC Holiday in 2013 at Baker's living room table in Santa Ana, California. The two had both recently married their wives and were struggling with wearing a traditional ring. They came up with the idea for silicone rings after Holiday suffered minor finger injuries while playing golf and weightlifting with traditional metallic wedding bands, resulting in him wearing no ring at all. QALO silicone rings are designed to be more comfortable and safer than traditional metal rings as they snap off if they get caught on something.

The rings are marketed towards active individuals and those with professions that result in their metal band being a safety hazard like athletes, firefighters, police officers, mechanics, electricians and others. The company also produces baseball caps and shirts.
